Brunneria borealis, common name Brunner's mantis, Brunner's stick mantis, or northern grass mantis, is a species of praying mantis native to the southern United States. It is the only mantis species known to reproduce solely through parthenogenesis; there are no males.

Description
Brunneria borealis is an elongated green insect with the typical raptorial forelimbs of a mantis. The adults have reduced-size wings and are probably unable to fly.

Distribution and habitat

B. borealis is native to the southern United States, from the Atlantic Ocean as far west as Texas where it occurs in Brazos County, Comanche County, Erath County, Conroe, Texas /Montgomery County, Azle, Texas/Tarrant County, and Euless, Texas/Parker County probably as separate local populations. It has been recorded in North Carolina, Southern Carolina, Georgia, Florida, Alabama, Louisiana, Mississippi, Arkansas, Oklahoma and Texas. At Austin, Texas it was found on flowerheads of the slender aster (Symphyotrichum subulatum. At Cedar Creek, Texas it was found in meadows of little bluestem grass (Schizachyrium scoparium) at night but was unnoticeable by day.

Biology
This mantis does not breed sexually and the adults, which are all female, lay their eggs without the involvement of a male. The clutch of eggs is protected by an ootheca or egg-case. In most mantid species, each mantid nymph emerges from its own hole in the egg-case, but in this species, one of the ootheca is drawn out into a point and all the nymphs emerge through this. The nymphs are similar to the adults in appearance and go through a series of moults as they grow.

Mantids are generally ambush predators, but little is known about the diet of this mantis. It can be found at night about a foot off the ground, climbing higher among the grasses if disturbed. Judging by its size, it probably feeds on grasshoppers.  This species also enjoys eating grass dwelling walkingsticks which are often slender instead of robust and have few defenses against the mantids.

See also
List of mantis genera and species

References

B
Mantodea of North America
Endemic fauna of the United States
Insects of the United States
Fauna of the Southeastern United States
Insects described in 1896